Stage Whisper is a double album by Charlotte Gainsbourg, released on December 13, 2011.

In 2012 it was awarded a double silver certification from the Independent Music Companies Association which indicated sales of at least 40,000 copies throughout Europe.

Track listing

References

2011 albums
Albums produced by Beck
Charlotte Gainsbourg albums